Jocelyn Scheffel Ballantine is a prosecutor and the Assistant U.S. Attorney at the Department of Justice.

Career 
She graduated from Columbia University, and Stanford Law School.

Department of Justice 
Ballantine was one of the Department of Justice attorneys staffed to Michael Flynn's prosecution. The Department admitted altering evidence in the case following a reprimand from the judge. Despite having initially claimed that key evidence was valid and free of alteration, correspondence between Andrew McCabe and Peter Strzok and the Department show that the documents were not vouched for accuracy. More specifically, Ballantine confirmed that McCage and Strozk's attorneys examined the accuracy of the evidence, but they had denied this being the case. Ballantine also provided altered documents to Sidney Powell, and submitted an FBI interview report with redactions to information that was crucial to the case. Ballantine declined to sign the motion to dismiss the charges against Flynn.

Ballantine is currently the lead prosecutor on a case regarding the Proud Boys' involvement in the 2021 United States Capitol attack.

References 

Living people
Year of birth missing (living people)
Place of birth missing (living people)
Assistant United States Attorneys
21st-century American lawyers
21st-century American women lawyers
Columbia University alumni
Stanford Law School alumni